Bahamas – United States relations are bilateral relations between the Commonwealth of The Bahamas and the United States of America.

History 
The Bahamas and the United States established diplomatic relations in 1973. Historically, they have had close economic and commercial relations. The countries share ethnic and cultural ties, especially in education, and the Bahamas is home to approximately 30,000 American residents. In addition, there are about 110 U.S.-related businesses in the Bahamas and, in 2005, 87% of the 5 million tourists visiting the Bahamas were American.

As a neighbor, the Bahamas and its political stability are important to the United States. The U.S. and the Bahamian government have worked together on reducing crime and addressing migration issues. With the closest island only 45 miles from the coast of Florida, the Bahamas often is used as a gateway for drugs and illegal aliens bound for the United States. The United States and the Bahamas cooperate to handle these threats. U.S. assistance and resources have been essential to Bahamian efforts to mitigate the persistent flow of illegal narcotics and migrants through the archipelago. The United States and the Bahamas also actively cooperate on law enforcement, civil aviation, marine research, meteorology, and agricultural issues. The U.S. Navy operates an underwater research facility on Andros Island. 

The Department of Homeland Security's Bureau of Customs and Border Protection maintains "pre-clearance" facilities at the airports in Nassau and Freeport. Travelers to the U.S. are interviewed and inspected before departure, allowing faster connection times in the U.S.

Principal U.S. officials
 Ambassador – Usha E. Pitts
 Deputy Chief of Mission – Timothy Zúñiga-Brown
 Management Officer – David Elmo
 Consul – Virginia Ramadan
 Political-Economic Section Chief – Daniel O'Connor
 Public Affairs Officer – Daniel O'Connor

Diplomatic missions

The Embassy of the Bahamas in Washington, D.C. is the diplomatic mission of the Commonwealth of The Bahamas to the United States.  It is located at 2220 Massachusetts Avenue, Northwest, Washington, D.C., in the Embassy Row neighborhood.  The embassy also operates Consulates-General in Atlanta, Miami, New York City and Washington D.C. Since March of 2022, the Ambassador of Bahamas to the USA has been Wendall K. Jones.

The U.S. Embassy for the Bahamas is located in Nassau, New Providence Island, the Bahamas.

See also
North American Free Trade Agreement
Free Trade Area of the Americas
Third Border Initiative
Caribbean Community
Caribbean Basin Initiative (CBI)
Caribbean Basin Trade Partnership Act
Western Hemisphere Travel Initiative
Foreign relations of the United States
Foreign relations of the Bahamas

References

External links
The United States Department of State - The Bahamas
The Embassy of the United States of America
The Bahamas-Sub Office of the U.S. Federal Bureau of Investigation